Gregg Olsen (born March 5, 1959 in Seattle, Washington) is a New York Times, USA Today and The Wall Street Journal bestselling author of nonfiction books and novels, most of which are crime-related. The subjects of his true crime books include convicted child rapist and school teacher Mary Kay Letourneau, product tampering killer Stella Nickell, fasting specialist Linda Burfield Hazzard, and former Amishman and convicted murderer Eli Stutzman.

Career
Olsen has received awards and acclaim for his writing. The Deep Dark: Disaster and Redemption in America's Richest Silver Mine was selected as Idaho Book of the Year in 2006 by the Idaho Libraries Association and was a finalist for a Spur Award for best contemporary historical nonfiction book by the Western Writers of America. In 2007, The Deep Dark was also selected by Boise State University as its first-year read for incoming freshmen. Starvation Heights was selected by Washington State Library and the Washington Secretary of State for its annual Everybody Reads literary program for books that contribute to the culture of the state.

Starvation Heights, a crime novel, was adapted for the stage by Portland, Oregon playwright Ginny Foster and debuted as a part of the National New Play Festival in July 2008. It was announced in January 2009 that the book was optioned by producer Jason Fogelson and Pulitzer Prize-winner Tracy Letts for a film adaptation with Letts named as writing the script. It also was listed as a New York Times bestseller at number 7 on December 28, 2014 in e-book nonfiction.

In 2012, Envy, a novel by Olsen, was Washington State Library's choice to represent Washington in the Pavilion of the States at the 2012 National Book Festival.

Olsen has appeared on "Good Morning America," "The Early Show," Court TV, "Entertainment Tonight," CNN, FOX News, 48 Hours, and other US and international TV programs discussing criminal cases.

Awards

Starvation Heights, originally published in 1997, reached number 9 on The New York Times bestseller list in the crime-and-punishment category on February 14, 2016.

Victim Six debuted on USA Today's bestseller list on October 2, 2014, with Closer Than Blood debuting the week of April 14, 2011 on USA Today's bestseller list, where it remained for three weeks.

Bodies of Evidence, the first in a book series titled Notorious USA, which Olsen wrote with co-author Rebecca Morris, debuted the week of September 22, 2013 at number 16 on The New York Times bestseller list in e-book nonfiction

If Loving You is Wrong, one of Olsen's Crime Rant Classics releases, made The New York Times bestseller list in e-book nonfiction at number 4 the week of August 18, 2013, and USA Today's bestseller list on August 8, 2013. It also made The Wall Street Journal'''s list, debuting at number 7 in the nonfiction e-book category the week of August 8, 2013.A Shocking True Story, released in 2013, was number 9 for two weeks on The New York Times bestseller list in e-book nonfiction the weeks of June 5 and June 16, 2013.

His first New York Times bestseller was Abandoned Prayers, which was number 11 for two weeks beginning the week of July 6, 2003 in paperback best sellers.

Personal life
Olsen lives in rural Olalla, Washington, with his wife, a graphic designer.

Bibliography

Nonfiction
 If You Tell: A True Story of Murder, Family Secrets, and the Unbreakable Bond of Sisterhood, (2019) about Michelle Knotek
 A Killing in Amish Country: Sex, Betrayal, and a Cold-blooded Murder, (2016) about the murder of Barbara Weaver by her husband Eli.
 A Twisted Faith, (2010) about Nick Hacheney, a philandering minister who killed his wife 
 The Deep Dark (2005), about the 1972 Sunshine mine fire in Kellogg, Idaho
 Starvation Heights, about Linda Burfield Hazzard
 Cruel Deception, aka, Mockingbird, the case of Munchausen Mom Tanya Reid
 If Loving You is Wrong, the story of Mary Kay Letourneau
 Abandoned Prayers, about the Eli Stutzman case
 Bitter Almonds, the story of Stella Nickell
 Black Widow, about Sharon Lynn Nelson
 If I Can't Have You: Susan Powell, Her Mysterious Disappearance, and the Murder of Her ChildrenNovels

 A Wicked Snow (2007)
 A Cold Dark Place (2008)
 Heart of Ice (2009)
 Victim Six (2010)
 Closer Than Blood (2011)
 Envy (2011)
 The Bone Box (2012)
 Betrayal (2012)
 Fear Collector (2013)
 Shocking True Story (2013)
 Run (2014)
 The Girl in the Woods (2014)
 Now That She's Gone (2015)
 Just Try to Stop Me (2016)
 The Sound of Rain (2016)
 The Boy She Left Behind (2017)
 The Last Thing She Ever Did (2018)
 Lying Next to Me'' (2019)

References

External links
 

1959 births
Living people
American non-fiction crime writers
21st-century American novelists
Writers from Seattle
American male novelists
21st-century American male writers
Novelists from Washington (state)
American crime fiction writers
21st-century American non-fiction writers
American male non-fiction writers